Georgia State Route 25 Connector may refer to:

 Georgia State Route 25 Connector (Brunswick): a connector route of State Route 25 that exists entirely in the southern part of Brunswick, entirely concurrent with US 25
 Georgia State Route 25 Connector (Savannah): a connector route of State Route 25 that exists in the northern part of Savannah

025 Connector